Don Alejandro Roces Sr. Science-Technology High School (DARSSTHS), located along Don A. Roces Avenue, Quezon City, Philippines.

References

Educational institutions established in 1963
Science high schools in Metro Manila
Schools in Quezon City
1963 establishments in the Philippines